Martina Mašková (born 15 February 1998) is a Czech ice hockey player for the Regina Cougars and the Czech national team. She represented the Czech Republic at the 2019 IIHF Women's World Championship.

References

External links

1998 births
Living people
Czech expatriate ice hockey players in Canada
Czech women's ice hockey forwards
Regina Cougars ice hockey players
Sportspeople from Ústí nad Labem
Universiade medalists in ice hockey
Medalists at the 2023 Winter World University Games
Universiade bronze medalists for the Czech Republic